The August 2020 California lightning wildfires (also referred to as the August lightning siege or August wildfire siege) were a series of 650 wildfires that ignited across Northern California in mid-August 2020, due to a siege of dry lightning from rare, massive summer thunderstorms, which were caused by an unusual combination of very hot, dry air at the surface, dry fuels, and advection of moisture from the remains of Tropical Storm Fausto northward into the Bay Area. The August 2020 lightning fires included three enormous wildfires: the SCU Lightning Complex, the August Complex, and the LNU Lightning Complex.

Meteorological background

Between August 14 and August 16, Northern California was subjected to record-breaking warm temperatures, due to anomalously strong high pressure over the region. Early on August 15, the National Weather Service for San Francisco issued a Fire Weather Watch highlighting the risk of wildfire starts due to the combination of lightning risk due to moist, unstable air aloft, dry fuels, and hot temperatures near the surface. Later that day, the Fire Weather Watch was upgraded to a Red Flag Warning, noting the risk of abundant lightning already apparent as the storms moved toward the region from the south.

The source of this plume of moist, unstable air was the weakening Tropical Storm Fausto. This moisture then interacted with a high-pressure ridge situated over Nevada that was bringing a long-track heat wave to much of California and the West. These colliding weather systems then created excessive atmospheric instability that generated massive thunderstorms throughout much of Northern and Central California. Additionally, much of these storms were only accompanied with dry lightning and produced little to no rain, making conditions very favorable for wildfires to spark and spread rapidly.

Early morning on August 16, when the first thunderstorms hit, around 2,500 lightning strikes hit the Bay Area, with 200 strikes happening in 30 minutes at one point, which the National Weather Service office in Bay Area labelled as "insane". Within the next 72–96 hours, over 12,000 lightning strikes were recorded over Northern California. These lightning strikes sparked up to 585 wildfires, many of which grew to be very large at a rapid pace due to parched brush, especially in Northern California.

A second wave of thunderstorms was forecasted to hit on August 23 and 24; however, they failed to materialize over the Bay Area, which has been most impacted by these fires, and instead just produced light rain and a few lightning strikes over the Sierra Nevada, barely having any impact.

Fires

Many of the fires were started or discovered on August 16 or 17:

CZU Lightning Complex

By August 20, the fire had caused extensive damage to the Big Basin Redwoods State Park. The towns of Pescadero and La Honda were threatened by flames.

LNU Lightning Complex

The LNU Lighting Complex was a complex of 7 different fires in the Sonoma, Lake, and Napa counties, with 4 major ones being the Hennessey, Gamble, 15-10, and 13-4 Fires. It first sparked around 6:37 AM on August 17, when a lightning storm passed over the Lake Hennessey area. Another lightning strike occurred at 6:39, near the Aonair winery, starting a fire that was 5 acres large. About 60 fires had sparked in the region during that time period, however, while some blazes were quickly contained at 1 or 2 acres, others rapidly went out of control. Around 9 AM, dry, gale-force winds between 20 and 40 miles per hour helped to fan the flames of two uncontrolled blazes, the Gamble Fire and the Hennessey Fire. On August 19, the fire raced fast towards Vacaville, and caused hundreds of evacuations. Many people fled the city with only their basic necessities, with police officers and firefighters going door to door warning people to evacuate. By August 20, the LNU fire had burned  and destroyed 480 structures. It forced the evacuation of some personnel in the Travis Air Force Base and the city of Healdsburg, California, that had already evacuated previously during the Tubbs Fire and the Kincade Fire.

SCU Lightning Complex

The SCU Lightning Complex was a cluster of 20 different fires in the Santa Clara, Contra Costa, Alameda, Stanislaus, and San Joaquin counties, that was divided into 3 different zones - the Deer Zone, Calaveras Zone, and Canyon Zone. By August 20, the fire burned  and was 5% contained, evacuating people in the East San Jose foothills, and threatening the Lick Observatory with flames.

Impacts 
The North Complex fire's Bear Fire had destroyed the town of Berry Creek. The SCU Lightning Complex fires have threatened the cities  of Fremont, Milpitas, Patterson, and San Jose, and also threatened Lick Observatory.

Evacuations

Air quality and smoke pollution
On September 9, 2020, the sky appeared orange across the Bay Area due to wildfire smoke.

See also 

 2020 California wildfires
 2020 Western United States wildfires

References 

August lightning
August 2020 events in the United States